Giuseppe Caprio (15 November 1914 – 15 October 2005), was an Italian cardinal of the Roman Catholic Church. He held the post of President of the Prefecture for the Economic Affairs of the Holy See before he retired in 1990.  He had been the internuncio, then pro-nuncio, to China from 1959 to 1967, and the pro-nuncio to India from 1967 to 1969.

He then transferred to the Roman Curia, serving as secretary of the Administration of the Patrimony of the Holy See, then to the Secretariat of State, where he worked for Pope John Paul I before being appointed President of the Administration of the Patrimony of the Holy See in 1979, and then to the presidency of the Prefecture for the Economic Affairs of the Holy See in 1981. He was elevated to the cardinalate in 1979, becoming Cardinal-Deacon of S. Maria Ausiliatrice in Via Tuscolana. He was Cardinal Protodeacon from 22 June 1987.

Cardinal Caprio opted for the order of cardinal priests on 26 November 1990, and became the Cardinal-Priest of the titular church of Santa Maria della Vittoria. He was also a Knight of St. Januarius.

External links 
 Biography

1914 births
2005 deaths
People from Avellino
Apostolic Nuncios to India
Economic history of the Holy See
20th-century Italian cardinals
Protodeacons
Participants in the Second Vatican Council
Administration of the Patrimony of the Apostolic See
Cardinals created by Pope John Paul II
Place of birth missing
Place of death missing
Grand Masters of the Order of the Holy Sepulchre